Narragansett High School is a public high school in Narragansett, Rhode Island. As of 2015, Narragansett High School serves 477 students in grades 9–12. Narragansett High School's mascot is a Mariner. The mascot's name is Murdock the Mariner.

References

External links

Buildings and structures in Narragansett, Rhode Island
Schools in Washington County, Rhode Island
Public high schools in Rhode Island